Edmund Frederick Phillips (12 January 1932 – 18 February 2020) was an English cricketer active from 1955 to 1959 who played for Leicestershire. He appeared in 32 first-class matches as a righthanded batsman who scored 629 runs with a highest score of 55.

References

1932 births
2020 deaths
English cricketers
Leicestershire cricketers
People from Bridgnorth